Pazhuvil is a small village in Trissur district of Kerala state, south India. It is 17 km from Thrissur town, on the Cherpu - Triprayar road.

Location
Pazhuvil village is very close to the city yet retains many qualities of an age old Kerala village. It has all modern facilities for dwellers (hospital, schools, church, Masjid, auditoriums, etc.). It is divided into east and west officially and is surrounded by paddy fields.

The main centers are the Sree Gokulam Arts and Science College Junction, Chazhoor road junction, Hospital junction, Pazhuvil centre, Panchayat junction and Gayathri bus stop. There is an aided school (more than seventy years old) "St Antony's HSS" run by the church, and a private CBSE school along with college.

Landmarks
The village has a well run Mission hospital and a Homeopathic hospital for the health care of the villagers. The government run veterinary hospital is nearly 50 years old and helps villagers to maintain their livestock. Aided school (St Antony's HSS). St Antony's Church.

History
The Village boasts of one of the early movers in the Co-operative movement in the state. The Pazhuvil Service Co-operative Society is more than a century old. For many years villagers were depending on the Bank run the Society for their financial transactions. It is one of the leading co-operative banks of the District. The financial transactions of the NRI's also has helped the growth of the bank.  The contribution of the bank to the farming.

Church History

The origin of Thattil family in Thrissur is linked with one of the army Chief of The King of Kochi. He was killed in a battle with Zamorin of Kozhikode at a place called Enamavu in Thrissur. As a mark of respect and memory of this great warrior, King promised to construct a church, where his body is buried. Accordingly, his body was buried in Pazhuvil in Thrissur and a church was constructed there. Velayanad church near Vellangallur is founded by Thattil Muthi. Thattil Clan, Which has its origin in the ancient Christian settlement of Pazhuvil located in the western part of Thrissur District, 17 km from the city in the Thrissur-Thriprayar Road. By virtue of its nobility and culture this family finds an important place among the 'Nazrani'-Thomas Christians of Kerala – families, legendarily claiming to be the descendants of those ancestors directly baptized by St. Thomas, one of the twelve Apostles of Lord Jesus Christ. Thattil Mapila who belonged to this clan and whose tomb is situated in the graveyard of Pazhuvil Catholic Church was built in the year 883 AD and catered to the spiritual needs of the Christians including those in Thrissur and its outskirts of the village is appreciable. The writer of Puthen pana, Arnos Padiri was lived and died here in Pazhuvil formerly Known as Pazhayoor "the land of fruits". The tomb of Arnos Padiri is situated in Pazhuvil. It has the credibility of the ancient churches in the Diocese of Trichur.

Places of worships 
The village has an old Subramanian temple and "vendrasery shiva temple"  "vellanchery kalinada kavu" Hindu temple with a temple pond for the devotees. The temple was scientifically analyzed to be around 2000 years old. 'SHASHTI' is the most prominent festival associated with the temple, during which a particular form of dancing, Kavadi aatam  is performed. Shivrathri is a famous festival in " Vendrasery shiva temple " similarly Karthikathali  and parayanthullal in "Vellanchery Kalinadakavu". 
St. Antony's Foraine Church is a Catholic church and the first church in India named after St. Antony. It was founded in 960 AD. This church is one of the famous pilgrimage centers in Kerala. It is renowned for the feast of St. Antony on the second Sunday after Easter, celebrated at the old shrine nearby the river.

Pazhuvil Mosque is the only Sunni juma Masjid in the road side of Thrissur-Cherpu-Thriprayar Road.
 Pazhuvil West Juma Masjid is Sunni Mosque Situated at the Western Part.

Personality 
Johann Ernst Hanxleden, a Jesuit missionary from Germany (known locally as Arnos Pathiri) came to Kerala in the beginning of the 18th century, learned Sanskrit and Malayalam, and wrote Puthen Pana based on the New Testament, sitting by the well of Pazhuvil church. Pathiri died of a snake bite on 20 March 1732 and was buried near the church. Later a memorial was built and his mortal remains were removed to the memorial. In order to maintain his memory a historical museum has also been started.

References

Villages in Thrissur district